Hedger is a surname. Notable people with the surname include:

Charles Hedger (born 1980), English guitarist
Grant Hedger, Australian rugby league player
Jennifer Hedger (born 1975), Canadian television personality
Kristin Hedger, American politician